Deportes Palmira was a Colombian football (soccer) team, based in Palmira. The club was founded in 2009 and played in Categoría Primera B. The club was formerly known as Girardot F.C. based in Girardot but due to financial difficulties, the club relocated to Buenaventura and was rebranded as Pacífico F.C.

External links
 http://dimayor.com.co/Equipos/Deportes_Palmira_317-9618.html

Football clubs in Colombia
Association football clubs established in 2009
2009 establishments in Colombia
Categoría Primera B clubs